Jacqueline M. Dewar (née Deveny) is an American mathematician and mathematics educator known for her distinguished teaching and her mentorship of women in mathematics. She is a professor emerita of mathematics at Loyola Marymount University.

Education and career
Dewar graduated summa cum laude in 1968 from Saint Louis University,
and earned her Ph.D. from the University of Southern California in 1973.
Her dissertation, Coincidence Theorems for Set Valued Mappings, was supervised by James Dugundji.

She was on the faculty of Loyola Marymount from 1973 until her retirement in 2013, and chaired the mathematics department there from 1983 to 1986 and again from 2005 to 2006.

Books
Dewar is the co-author with Dennis G. Zill of a series of mathematics textbooks on algebra, trigonometry, precalculus, and calculus. With C. Bennett and M. Fisher, she is also the author of The scholarship of teaching and learning: A guide for scientists, engineers, and mathematicians (Oxford University Press, 2018).

Recognition
In 2006, the Mathematical Association of America gave Dewar the Deborah and Franklin Haimo Award for Distinguished College or University Teaching of Mathematics. The award citation credited her for shaping several mathematics degree programs at Loyola Marymount, for her in-service work with school teachers, for her work running mathematics conferences for secondary school girls, and for "her passionate devotion to the art of teaching".

In 2018, Dewar was awarded a Service Award by the Association for Women in Mathematics.  This award "recognizes individuals for helping to promote and support women in mathematics through exceptional volunteer service to the AWM." In 2019 she won the Louise Hay Award.

Dewar was selected to be part of the 2019 class of fellows of the Association for Women in Mathematics "for her work to encourage females to study and be successful in mathematics; for her commitment to educating pre-service teachers, with particular attention to gender equity; for her outreach to liberal arts students to change attitudes about mathematics and women in mathematics; and for her exemplary teaching and mentoring".

In the media
Dewar appears with Jim Carrey and others in the documentary film The Number 23 Enigma (2007), explaining mathematics related to the horror film The Number 23.

References

External links
Home page

Year of birth missing (living people)
Living people
20th-century American mathematicians
21st-century American mathematicians
American women mathematicians
Mathematics educators
Saint Louis University alumni
Saint Louis University mathematicians
University of Southern California alumni
Loyola Marymount University faculty
Fellows of the Association for Women in Mathematics
20th-century women mathematicians
21st-century women mathematicians
20th-century American women
21st-century American women